Balykly (Balıqlı) is a rural locality (a selo) and the administrative centre of Balyklinsky Selsoviet, Fyodorovsky District, Bashkortostan, Russia. The population was 677 as of 2010. There are 14 streets.

Geography 
Balykly is located 16 km southeast of Fyodorovka (the district's administrative centre) by road. Polynovka is the nearest rural locality.

References 

Rural localities in Fyodorovsky District